Honsellstrasse Stadion is a former multi-use stadium in Karlsruhe, Germany. It was used as the stadium of VfB Mühlburg association football matches.  The capacity of the stadium was 30,000 spectators.

References

Defunct football venues in Germany
Defunct sports venues in Germany
Sport in Karlsruhe
Sports venues in Baden-Württemberg